Comamonas terrae is a bacterium from the genus Comamonas, which was isolated from agricultural soil in Thailand. C. terrae has an arsenite-oxidizing ability.

References

External links
Type strain of Comamonas terrae at BacDive -  the Bacterial Diversity Metadatabase

Comamonadaceae
Bacteria described in 2012